Mount Ashland ski area is located on  Mount Ashland and features 23 trails on  served by four lifts, in addition to chute skiing in a glacial cirque called The Bowl. The mountain receives over 225" of snow annually, with a season from early December until mid-April. Half of the terrain is rated as advanced, and 15% is rated beginner.

A Non-Profit Ski Area

Mt. Ashland is a community-focused ski area that is owned and operated by the non-profit Mt. Ashland Association. Mt. Ashland is dedicated to providing an outstanding alpine recreation experience for people of all ages and skill levels. To help meet its mission, Mt. Ashland offers the popular After School Youth Program which offers low-cost and free instruction to local youth. The 7,500' Crew Internship program also offers young people an opportunity to grow and develop at the ski area.

History 

During the 1950s, the mountain was a popular destination for local back country ski enthusiasts, some of whom built the lodge and one lift in 1963. In the 1970s, the area was managed by the Southern Oregon College Foundation (now Southern Oregon University) until it was purchased by Dick Hicks, a local businessman, in 1977. In 1983, the ski area was sold to Harbor Properties of Seattle, the owners of Stevens Pass Ski Area. Two new lifts were built during their ownership and night skiing lights were installed. In 1991, the City of Ashland purchased the ski resort through a community fundraising campaign and a grant from the Oregon Economic Development Fund. The slogan of the community fundraising campaign was "Save Mount Ashland."

In 1929, the City of Ashland got the Forest Service to agree that the city would participate in any forest management that might impact water quality of the  Ashland Creek watershed, the city's main municipal water supply.

Throughout the 1940s and 1950s, backcountry skiing on Mount Ashland grew in popularity among local residents, prompting some to envision a developed ski area.

During 1961 to 1963, the Mount Ashland Corporation raised money to clear trees, grade terrain, build roads, and develop a ski area. It includes a ski lodge, the Ariel chairlift, a T-bar lift, and a rope tow on the north face of the mountain. Medford businessman Glenn Jackson provided more than half of the $120,000 that financed construction of the lodge.

In 1970, after three consecutive years of winter drought deprived the mountain of adequate snowfall to continue operations, the Mount Ashland Corporation folded. The Southern Oregon College Foundation took over management the ski area after the people of Jackson County financed the purchase of ski area resources in the first of two public bailouts in the operation's history.

In 1975, the City of Ashland signed a new Memorandum of Understanding with USFS in which the city agreed to hire consultants to monitor conditions in the Ashland Creek watershed and USFS agreed to implement any measures necessary to maintain watershed quality.

In 1977, Dick Hicks purchased the ski area from Jackson County and incorporated it as Ski Ashland, Inc.

In 1978, Ski Ashland installed the Windsor chairlift. The monitoring effort led by USFS Ashland district ranger, Glendon Jefferies, observed the East Fork of Ashland Creek flowing "a solid reddish brown" below the ski area. Jefferies wrote to Ski Ashland in 1978, "The Mount Ashland Ski Area is a major source of sediment pollution in the East Fork of Ashland Creek." A 1979 report by James Montgomery to the city administrator made a similar finding.

In 1983, Harbor Properties of Seattle purchased Ski Ashland from Hicks. Over the next four years, Harbor developed on-slope lighting, a vehicle shop, and the Sonnet and Comer chair lifts.

Drought struck again in 1988–1991 and skier use declined. In 1991, a grassroots effort raised two million dollars to save Mount Ashland from bankruptcy. Money for the purchase came from donor restricted contributions and a grant from the Oregon Economic Development Fund channeled through the City of Ashland. The city accepted donated funds and purchased Ski Ashland from Harbor Properties. The city then hired Mount Ashland Association (MAA), a newly formed non-profit corporation, to maintain and operate the ski area.

In 1992, the City of Ashland entered a lease agreement with MAA. The lease expired on June 30, 2017, with an option to be renewed or terminated. From 2005 through 2008, the City and MAA had a series of legal disputes, which were resolved with the City relinquishing the Special Use Permit to MAA with certain requirements to protect the Ashland Watershed.

In 2007 and 2016, Mt. Ashland hosted the Oregon Interscholastic Racing Association high school state championships.

The Mt. Ashland Association continues to manage the ski area for the benefit for the entire community. Numerous programs benefiting the community include the 7,500' Crew teen internship program, the deeply-discounted After School Youth Program, the ACCESS Ski & Ride for Hunger day, and the Women of Winter program.

Expansion 
The ski area attempted to expand its terrain and add lifts in the 1990s. The proposal is still being debated and is well documented in the Mount Ashland Ski Area Expansion article.

Other activities 

Mount Ashland is a popular destination in summer for hiking, mountain biking, and sightseeing. The southernmost stretch of the Pacific Crest Trail in Oregon skirts the south and east sides of the mountain. The Mt. Ashland Hillclimb Run starts in Lithia Park near downtown Ashland and runners run up a series of Forest Service roads and trails to the summit of Mt. Ashland: 13+ miles long, 1 mile up. The Jean Chinn Memorial Mount Ashland Hill Climb Race is a hill climb, and a combination road and mountain bike race, starting from the town of Ashland and ending at the Mount Ashland ski area parking lot, with a different route for road and mountain bikes. Finally, the Mt. Ashland 5K Trail Run, America's Friendliest 5K, begins in the ski area parking lot, with runners ascending to the summit and returning to the parking lot via a series of roads leading down from the summit.

Climate 

Mount Ashland Ski Area has an oceanic subalpine climate (Köppen climate classification Dsc). The high elevation results in heavy precipitation, despite being located at the end of the Rogue Valley, which is located in a rain shadow.

References

External links 
 
 Mount Ashland Ski Area, official website
 Rogue-Siskiyou National Forest
 Spring Thaw mountain bike festival
 Callahan's Challenge Hill Climb Time Trial Series
 Jean Chinn Memorial Mount Ashland Hill Climb Race
 Siskiyou Out Back

Tourist attractions in Jackson County, Oregon
Landmarks in Oregon
Ski areas and resorts in Oregon
Cirques of the United States
Buildings and structures in Ashland, Oregon
1963 establishments in Oregon
Sports in Ashland, Oregon

de:Mount Ashland